The H.B. Rice Insurance Building is a historic building located in Paintsville, Kentucky, United States. The building was constructed in 1890 by Harvey Burns Rice, who in 1908, opened an insurance company in the building. It was added to the National Register of Historic Places on January 29, 1989.

The building is currently occupied by a local Mexican restaurant chain.

References

Commercial buildings completed in 1890
National Register of Historic Places in Johnson County, Kentucky
Commercial buildings on the National Register of Historic Places in Kentucky
Office buildings in Kentucky
1890 establishments in Kentucky
Italianate architecture in Kentucky